Jack Locksley Wood (4 November 1904 – 3 March 1990) was an Australian rules footballer who played with Fitzroy in the Victorian Football League (VFL).		
		
In 1941 Wood enlisted in the Royal Australian Air Force.

Notes

External links 
		

1904 births
1990 deaths
Australian rules footballers from Victoria (Australia)
Fitzroy Football Club players
Royal Australian Air Force personnel of World War II